The Hurting is the debut studio album by British new wave band Tears for Fears, released on 7 March 1983. The album peaked at No. 1 on the UK Albums Chart in its second week of release and was certified Gold by the BPI within three weeks of release. It reached Platinum status in January 1985. The album also entered the Top 40 in several other countries including Canada, Germany, and Australia.

The Hurting is a loose concept album focusing on themes of child abuse, psychological trauma and depression. Despite its dark subject matter, the album was a huge commercial success. It contains Tears for Fears' first three hit singles – "Mad World", "Change", and "Pale Shelter" – all of which reached the top five in the UK and the Top 40 internationally. It also contains a new version of the band's first single, "Suffer the Children", which had originally been released in 1981, while the album version of "Pale Shelter" is also a new recording.

The album was remastered and reissued in 1999, and included four remixes as bonus tracks and an extensive booklet with liner notes about the album's creation. A 30th anniversary reissue was released on 21 October 2013, in both double-CD and deluxe four-disc boxed set editions. For the album's 40th anniversary, new Dolby Atmos and 5.1 surround sound Blu-ray remixes by Steven Wilson, as well as a remastered vinyl edition of the original mix, will be released in May 2023.

Writing and recording
The songs were written by Roland Orzabal inspired by his own childhood traumas and the primal theories by Arthur Janov. Most of the songs were heavily inspired by the writings of Janov. "Ideas as Opiates" was named after a chapter in his 1980 book "Prisoners of Pain", which also was a direct influence on the song "The Prisoner". Musical influences included Gary Numan, Talking Heads and Peter Gabriel. 

Having worked with different producers on their first two singles, they recruited Chris Hughes to produce the album. The core of the band Orzabal and Curt Smith worked in a close and democratic collaboration with producers Hughes and Ross Cullum, only using ideas all four of them agreed on. Prior to the album "Mad World", originally thought of as a single b-side, was released and became a hit single. The first two singles "Suffer the Children" and "Pale Shelter" were re-recorded for the album.

Critical reception

Contemporary
Contemporary reviews of the album were mixed. In Smash Hits magazine, Fred Dellar gave the album a positive review and stated that "there's no doubting the talent on display." In the NME Gavin Martin was scathing, stating that "this record and others like it are a terrible, useless sort of art that makes self pity and futility a commercial proposition", and that "Tears for Fears and their listeners sound like they've given up completely, retreating from the practical world into a fantasy". He described the album's music as "just the sort of doom laden dross you'd expect from the lyrics: rehashed and reheated hollow doom with a bit of Ultravox here, diluted Joy Division poured everywhere, and the title track sounding suspiciously like one of the old pompous outfits with a welter of mellotrons – Barclay James Harvest per chance?" Melody Makers Steve Sutherland felt that "Tears for Fears's pop primal therapy tends to luxuriate in the attention it attracts, sounds ironically happy to wallow inspirationally instead of seeking exorcism". However, he observed that "the Tears for Fears formula – to translate childhood traumas into adult romance with Freudian fanaticism – is ludicrously laboured but, crucially, their lyrical lethargy is salvaged by what really sells them; their structural invention... sensibly, their suffering's usually controlled to sound smooth", and that this was the strength of the record: "The success of The Hurting lies in its lack of friction, in its safety and, for all their claims that coping with relationships has been warped beyond their ken, Tears for Fears have contrived an assured masterpiece of seduction".

In the US David Fricke of Rolling Stone said that "Tears for Fears stand out among the current crop of identikit synth-pop groups by virtue of their resourceful, stylish songwriting and fetching rhythmic sway. Granted, the adolescent angst and bleak, pained romanticism of singer-instrumentalists Curt Smith and Roland Orzabel [sic] sometimes come off as an adequate imitation of Joy Division, at best. But for every lapse into sackcloth-and-ashes anguish on The Hurting, the duo's debut album, there is a heady, danceable pop tune like 'Change'... Tears for Fears may be too concerned with their own petty traumas, but it is a testimony to their refined pop instincts that they manage to produce this much pleasure from the pain."

Retrospective
Retrospective reviews regarded the album more highly. Reviewing the 1999 reissue for Q, Andrew Collins said, "Despite its occasional bum note, The Hurting remains a landmark work... a highly emotional pop record, at its simplest". Bruce Eder of AllMusic noted that the album's success was due to "its makers' ability to package an unpleasant subject – the psychologically wretched family histories of Roland Orzabal and Curt Smith – in an attractive and sellable musical format" and said "the work is sometimes uncomfortably personal, but musically compelling enough to bring it back across the decades".

For the 30th anniversary edition in 2013, Danny Eccleston of Mojo pondered, "Has there ever been a more thoroughly miserable mainstream pop album than The Hurting?... Even when it is uptempo it is sombre, and at its most musically adventurous, in the cavernous minimalism of 'Ideas as Opiates' and gnarly dissonances of 'The Prisoner', it's almost unbearably bereft... But in essence, it was pop." Tom Byford of Record Collector summarised the album as "a surfeit of complex ideas reflecting troubled upbringings married with immediate, infectious, hummable tunes". John Bergstrom of PopMatters said that "at times, the unflinching approach works to the album's detriment, as Orzabal's songwriting skirts cliché and the obtuse, teenage poetry that some critics seized on at the time of The Hurtings release... But part of the brilliance of Hurting is that such histrionic moments are so seldom. Rather, time after time, as rendered by Orzabal and co-vocalist Curt Smith, the words connect at gut level and in sincere fashion." Calling the record "simply one of the strongest, most fully-realized albums of the early-to-mid-1980s", Bergstrom noted its influence on later acts such as Trent Reznor, Smashing Pumpkins and Arcade Fire, and concluded, "The albums that prove to be special, influential, and groundbreaking in their own time, and then in subsequent eras as well, are far and few between. Thirty years on, there is little doubt where The Hurting stands."

At least three of the songs from this particular album were sampled by one of the most mainstream R&B artists. "Memories Fade" was reworked by Kanye West on his 808s & Heartbreak album into "Coldest Winter". "Pale Shelter" was sampled by The Weeknd on the song "Secrets" on his Starboy album. "Ideas as Opiates" was sampled by Drake on the song "Lust for Life", from his So Far Gone mixtape. 

Mad World was covered by Michael Andrews and Gary Jules originally for Donnie Darko soundtrack, but later successfully released as a single, topping UK Singles Charts.

Track listing 
All songs written by Roland Orzabal.

Original release

Notes
† – The 1999 remastered version of the album incorrectly credits Curt Smith as co-writer and Mike Howlett as producer of "Pale Shelter" (Long Version). As confirmed on the original releases, Smith did not write any of the tracks for The Hurting and this version of "Pale Shelter" is actually the 1983 12" extended version of the song, which was produced by Chris Hughes and Ross Cullum. Howlett produced the original 1982 version.
†† – "The Way You Are" was originally a non-album track, although the 12" version was included on the remastered version of The Hurting in 1999.

30th anniversary editions (2013)
Two deluxe editions of the album were released on 21 October 2013. One is a double CD comprising CDs 1 & 2 (as below), and the other is a 4-disc boxed set comprising CDs 1–3 and a DVD (as below), a book containing interviews, a new essay from Paul Sinclair about the album, a replica of a 1983 tour programme, a discography and photos. The first 500 pre-orders from the Universal Music online store also included a vinyl 7" single of "Change" in a rare earlier picture sleeve.

Notes
† – Track 4, labeled as "Ideas As Opiates (Alternate Version)", was intended to be the first version of the song (originally released as the B-Side to "Mad World") but was mistakenly replaced by a previously unreleased version of the album track.
†† – Track 15, although labeled as "We Are Broken", it was intended to be the version found as the B-side to "Pale Shelter", however it was accidentally replaced with the audio track of "Broken Revisited" which is a slightly extended version of the original track and was first included as a bonus track on the limited edition cassette of Songs from the Big Chair in 1985 and later included on the 1999 remastered edition and 2006 deluxe edition of the same album.

Personnel 
Credits adapted from the album's liner notes.

Tears for Fears
 Roland Orzabal – lead vocals (1, 4-7, 10), backing vocals, guitars, keyboards, rhythm programming
 Curt Smith – lead vocals (1-3, 8-9), backing vocals, bass, keyboards
 Manny Elias – drums, rhythm programming
 Ian Stanley – keyboards programming, computer programming

Additional personnel
 Chris Hughes – rhythm programming, tuned percussion, conducting
 Ross Cullum – jazz high, dynamic toggle (percussion)
 Mel Collins – saxophones
 Phil Palmer – Palmer picking (guitar)
 Caroline Orzabal – child vocal on "Suffer the Children"

Charts

Weekly charts

Year-end charts

Certifications

References 

Tears for Fears albums
1983 debut albums
Mercury Records albums
Albums produced by Chris Hughes (musician)